Henry Goedjen was a member of the Wisconsin State Assembly.

Biography
Goedjen was born on June 26, 1844. He died in 1911.

Career
Goedjen was a member of the Assembly in 1882 and 1883. Other positions he held include Supervisor and Chairman of the town board (similar to city council) of Two Rivers (town), Wisconsin. He was a Democrat.

References

External links

People from Two Rivers, Wisconsin
Democratic Party members of the Wisconsin State Assembly
Mayors of places in Wisconsin
Wisconsin city council members
1844 births
1911 deaths
Burials in Wisconsin